The 2018 Buckle Up in Your Truck 225 was the 12th stock car race of the 2018 NASCAR Camping World Truck Series season and the eighth iteration of the event. The race was held on Thursday, July 12, 2018, in Sparta, Kentucky, at Kentucky Speedway, a 1.5-mile (2.41 km) tri-oval speedway. The race took the scheduled 150 laps to complete. At race's end, Ben Rhodes of ThorSport Racing would win after not pitting for tires on the final round of pit stops, earning his second career NASCAR Camping World Truck Series win and his first and only of the season. To fill out the podium, Stewart Friesen of Halmar Friesen Racing and Matt Crafton of ThorSport Racing would finish second and third, respectively.

Background 

Kentucky Speedway is a 1.5-mile (2.4 km) tri-oval speedway in Sparta, Kentucky, which has hosted ARCA, NASCAR and Indy Racing League racing annually since it opened in 2000. The track is currently owned and operated by Speedway Motorsports, Inc. and Jerry Carroll, who, along with four other investors, owned Kentucky Speedway until 2008. The speedway has a grandstand capacity of 117,000. Construction of the speedway began in 1998 and was completed in mid-2000. The speedway has hosted the Gander RV & Outdoors Truck Series, Xfinity Series, IndyCar Series, Indy Lights, and most recently, the NASCAR Cup Series beginning in 2011.

Entry list

Practice

First practice 
The first practice session would occur on Thursday, July 12, at 9:05 AM EST and would last for 50 minutes.

Second practice 
The second and final practice session, sometimes known as Happy Hour, would occur on Thursday, July 12, at 11:05 AM EST and would last for 50 minutes.

Qualifying 
Qualifying would occur on Thursday, July 12, at 5:10 PM EST. Since Kentucky Speedway is at least a 1.5 miles (2.4 km) racetrack, the qualifying system was a single car, single lap, two round system where in the first round, everyone would set a time to determine positions 13–32. Then, the fastest 12 qualifiers would move on to the second round to determine positions 1–12.

Myatt Snider would crash on his first lap, hitting the turn 4 wall. He would not make a lap, but would still qualify by owner's points.

Two drivers would fail to qualify: Joe Nemechek and Timmy Hill.

Full qualifying results

Race results 
Stage 1 Laps: 35

Stage 2 Laps: 35

Stage 3 Laps: 80

References 

2018 NASCAR Camping World Truck Series
NASCAR races at Kentucky Speedway
July 2018 sports events in the United States
2018 in sports in Kentucky